Chinese horror include films from China, Hong Kong, and Taiwan that are part of the stream of Asian horror films. Like Korean and Japanese horror as well as other Asian horror films, many focus on ghosts (yurei is also very common), supernatural environments, and suffering. Perhaps one of the best films for C-horror is The Eye directed by the Pang brothers which was later remade.

There is also some comedy elements such as Bio Zombie, Troublesome Night film series, The Vampire Who Admires Me, and My Left Eye Sees Ghosts.

Jiangshi

Jiangshi fiction, revolving around the hopping vampire or zombie, is a subgenre of Chinese horror. A staple genre of Hong Kong cinema, jiangshi films blend horror with elements of comedy.